A collective of fictional characters appear in American comic books published by Marvel Comics featuring the superhero Iron Man as the main protagonist.

From the introduction of Iron Man in Tales of Suspense #39 (1963), Iron Man has accumulated a large range of supporting characters. They are friends, employees of Tony Stark, and other superheroes. This is a list of them:

Family

Family from other media

 Gregory Stark – Tony Stark's older twin brother in Ultimate Marvel Universe. He's part of the Avengers Project led by Nick Fury.
 Morgan Stark – Morgan Stark is the daughter of Tony Stark and Pepper Potts in the Marvel Cinematic Universe film Avengers: Endgame (2019). Lexi Rabe portrayed Morgan Stark.
 Andros Stark – Andros Stark is the grandson of Tony Stark in Iron Man: Armoured Adventures. He went back in time from the year 2099 to protect the future.

Supporting characters
 Abraham "Abe" Zimmer – Abe Zimmer was a senior member of Stark Enterprises board of directors and trustee of Tony Stark's corporate assets.
 Andy Bhang – Former Chief Robotics of Stark Unlimited, currently the owner of Bang Robotics.
 Bambina Arbogast – Bambina Arbogast is the former executive assistant to Tony Stark at Stark International. 
 Bethany Cabe – Bethany Cabe is Tony Stark's former girlfriend and Chief of Security at Stark Unlimited. She possess gymnastic abilities and was highly trained in hand-to-hand combat.
 Doctor Shapiro – Doctor Shapiro is a hyper-intelligent cat working for Stark Unlimited, as an expert in superhuman biology.
 Eddie March – Eddie March is a boxer and friend to Tony Stark.
 F.R.I.D.A.Y. – An artificial intelligence that would appear as a hologram and act as Tony Stark's secretary.
 Guardsman – Kevin O'Brien was head of the research department at Stark Industries and a close friend of Tony Stark. However, after building the Guardsman armor, Kevin O'Brien became an adversary to Iron Man.
 Halcyon – A deaf mutant street racer and engineer with the power to control his heartbeat.
 Happy Hogan – Hired by Tony Stark as his chauffeur and personal assistant after Happy saves Tony's life.
 H.O.M.E.R. – Heuristically Operative Matrix Emulation Rostrum. An artificial intelligence in charge of all of Tony Stark's secret manufacturing projects.
 Ho Yinsen – A medical genius and pacifist. Plays a key role in Iron Man's origin story as a mentor and co-builder of his first armor.
 J.A.R.V.I.S. – The program that helps operate Pepper Potts's Rescue suit.
 Jocasta – Built by the robot Ultron, she aided the Avengers. Jocasta later became the Chief Robotics Ethicist at Stark Unlimited.
 Maria Hill – Becomes a core member of Stark's S.H.I.E.L.D. cabinet and assists Stark in dealing with a sudden rise in various terrorist groups.
 Michael O'Brien – Michael O'Brien was a police sergeant who believed Iron Man was responsible for his brother's death. After fighting Iron Man as the Guardsman, he discovered his mistake and eventually became an ally to Iron Man.
 Maya Hansen – A scientist who developed the Extremis virus along with Aldrich Killian. She is an old friend of Stark.
 Pepper Potts –  Originally a member of Tony Stark's secretarial pool. She later becomes part of a love triangle with Tony Stark and Happy Hogan.
 Sal Kennedy – Sal Kennedy is a friend and mentor for Tony Stark and Maya Hansen.
 Toni Ho – Dr. Toni Ho is an engineer and daughter of Ho Yinsen who wore the Iron Patriot armor as a member of the U.S.Avengers.
 Riri Williams – Riri is a young girl who created her own version of the Iron Man Armour suit and is mentored by Tony Stark.
 War Machine – James Rhodes is a pilot who helped Iron Man flee from the Viet Cong soldiers after his escape from Wong-Chu's prison camp. He would later become Tony Stark's best friend and wear his own power armor.

Love interests  

 Amara Perera – Dr. Amara Perera is a brilliant biophysicist who developed a cure for the mutant gene that theoretically prevented Mutants from receiving their abilities. Amara was the girlfriend of Tony Stark, who would later leave him for Victor Von Doom.
 Black Widow - First introduced as a Russian spy and as a villain of Stark himself. She would later redeem herself joining the S.H.I.E.L.D. and later becoming a member of the Avengers.
 Cassandra Gillispie – Cassandra Gillespie was the daughter of a weapons manufacturer rival of Howard Stark. Cassandra and Tony Stark were seeing each other when he was studying at University of Cambridge. Years later, Tony Stark crossed paths with Cassandra when he was trying to find out about his true parentage.
 Madame Masque – Whitney Frost is an occasional love interest, enemy of Iron Man and the daughter of Count Nefaria. Her birth name is Giuletta Nefaria. Raised as a wealthy socialite, Whitney Frost wore a golden mask to cover up her disfigured face and continues to do so after her face was healed due to paranoia.
 Indries Moomji – Indries Moomji was the girlfriend of Tony Stark who was recruited by Obadiah Stane as the Queen in his group the Chessmen. She seduced Tony Stark and played a role leading to his downfall.
 Rumiko Fujikawa – Girlfriend of Tony Stark and daughter of Kenjiro Fujikawa, the man who had taken over Stark's company during his stay in the Heroes Reborn universe.
 Sunset Bain – Sunset Bain met Tony Stark when they were MIT undergraduate. She seduced him into revealing the security codes for Stark Industries and stole several prototypes. Shortly thereafter, Sunset founded Baintronics and broke it off with Tony Stark. She  assumed the Madame Menace persona to make underground arms deals while Baintronic minted a spotless reputation.
 Wasp – Wasp (Janet Van Dyme) founded the Avengers with Iron Man and had a significative relationship with him twice.
 Patsy Walker/Hellcat - In Christopher Cantwell's run of Iron Man, Patsy serves as Tony's love interest. Tony even proposes to her, though she turns him down.

Allies  

 The Avengers
 Captain America
 Thor
 Hank Pym
 Wasp (Nadia Pym)
 Hulk
 Quicksilver
 Scarlet Witch
 Hawkeye
 Black Panther
 Black Widow (Natasha Romanova)
 Falcon
 Mar-Vell
 Captain Marvel
 Scott Lang
 Vision
 Hercules
 Black Knight
 Blade
 Robbie Reyes
 S.H.I.E.L.D.
 Nick Fury
 Maria Hill
 Jasper Sitwell
 West Coast Avengers
 Hawkeye 
 Mockingbird
 Wonder Man
 The Thing
 Hank Pym
 Moon Knight
 Firebird
 The Wasp
 Scarlet Witch
 Vision
 U.S. Agent
 Human Torch
 Quicksilver
 Machine Man
 Living Lightning
 Spider-Woman
 Darkhawk
 Mighty Avengers
 Ms. Marvel
 Wonder Man
 Black Widow
 Sentry
 Ares
 New Avengers
 Captain America
 Luke Cage
 Spider-Man
 Wolverine
 Sentry
 Echo
 Spider-Woman
 Dr Strange
 Iron Fist
 Ronin
 Fantastic Four / Future Foundation 
 Mister Fantastic (Reed Richards)
 The Thing (Ben Grimm)
 Invisible Woman (Susan Storm)
 Human Torch (Johnny Storm) 
 Franklin Richards
 Valeria Richards
 Illuminati
 Mister Fantastic (Reed Richards)
 Black Bolt
 Doctor Strange
 Black Panther
 Professor Xavier
 Namor
 Beast
 Guardians of the Galaxy
 Star-Lord
 Gamora
 Rocket Raccoon
 Drax the Destroyer
 Groot
 Mantis
 Moondragon
 Force Works 
 War Machine
 Century
 Cybermancer
 Moonraker
 Scarlet Witch
 Spider-Woman (Julia Carpenter)
 U.S. Agent
 Quake
 Mockingbird
 Wonder Man
 All New All Different Avengers
 Falcon
 Jane Foster
 Kamala Khan
 Nova (Sam Alexander)
 Miles Morales

See also
 List of Iron Man enemies
 List of Captain America enemies

References 

supporting
Lists of Marvel Comics characters
Lists of supporting characters in comics